Gardener Butte is a summit in the U.S. state of Oregon.

Gardener Butte was named in 1884 after Raphael Gardener Sr., a pioneer settler.

References

Buttes of Oregon
Mountains of Jackson County, Oregon
Mountains of Oregon